Telescreen B.V. (formerly known as Telecable Benelux B.V.) is a Netherlands-based television production company that was acquired by the German company Made 4 Entertainment (m4e) in 2008. It has produced and distributed children's TV series such as Miffy, Moomin and Alfred J Kwak since 1983.

The international Consumer Products department manages and develops the merchandising programs of animated properties worldwide, such as Frog & Friends and Lizzie McGuire.

As licensing agent, they also represent some of the world's major entertainment companies in the Benelux territory, such as: BBC Worldwide, Turner Broadcasting, Chapman Entertainment and Aardman Animations.

The company services the full range of children's entertainment production, from animation production, TV distribution, home entertainment, consumer products, royalty administration to artwork coordination and creation.

History 
Telescreen B.V. was founded in 1983 under the name Telecable Benelux BV by Dennis Livson and Jos Kaandorp. In 1994, the name Telecable Benelux B.V. was changed into Telescreen B.V. Soon thereafter, Livson sold the company to the giant Japanese entertainment firm Mitsui & Company, which acquired the company through a spin-off subsidiary, Pri-mation Media B.V.

In 1998, Dutch producer & distributor Palm Plus Produkties acquired Pri-mation Media, becoming the holding company for it and, as a result, Telescreen.

In December 2008, the German brand management & media company Made 4 Entertainment (m4e) acquired Telescreen. In 2017, Studio 100 Media acquired a majority share in m4e, with their share increasing to 100% in 2020, making Telescreen B.V. and its library a subsidiary of Studio 100.

List of productions
Dick Bruna's Miffy Storybooks: The Original Series – the classics (1984-1992)
Ox Tales (1987–1988)
Wowser (1988–1989) (co-production with J.C.Staff)
Alfred J. Kwak (1989–1990) (co-production with VARA, ZDF, Televisión Española and TV Tokyo)
Star Street (1989–1990)
Moomin (1990–1992)
Comet in Moominland (1992)
Bamboo Bears (1994)
Flying Rhino Junior High (1998–2000)
The Famous Jett Jackson (1998–2001)
The Paz Show (2003-2008) (co-production with Egmont Imagination, King Rollo Films and Open Mind Productions for Discovery Kids)
Plonsters (1999)
Pokémon (1999-2001) (Dutch dub only; Seasons 1-3 only)
Even Stevens (2000-2003)
Anton (2001)
Miffy and Friends – stop-motion animation (2002–2008)
Hans Christian Andersen – The Fairytaler (2003)
Yellow Giraffe's Animal Stories (2003)
Lizzie McGuire (2003–2004) (International distribution; 2003-2004 only)
Het Zandkasteel (2005-present)
Frog & Friends (2009)
Rudolf – the world's most determined door-to-door salesman (2010)
Conni (2011-2015)
Miffy the Movie (2013)
Miffy's Adventures Big and Small (2015-present)
The Little Vampire 3D (2017)

References

External links
 
 m4e – made for entertainment

Entertainment companies established in 1983
Television production companies of the Netherlands